Tony Rohr (born 1940) is an Irish actor.

Career
Rohr played Grandad in The Lakes and Solomon Featherstone in Middlemarch. He has also appeared in The Bill, The Long Good Friday, McVicar, Softly, Softly, Crown Court, The Sweeney, Casualty, Lovejoy, I Hired a Contract Killer, Cracker, The Vet, Father Ted, Waking the Dead, Hustle and Inspector George Gently. He played the railway station master in the 2010 film Leap Year. He played the IRA Brigade Commander in Yorkshire TV's Harry's Game. He recently played Anthony, the estranged father of the title character, Derek, in the series of the same name written and directed by Ricky Gervais.

Personal life
He has a daughter Louise with actress Pauline Collins. Collins gave baby Louise up for adoption in 1964. They were reunited 22 years later. Collins' book, Letter To Louise, documents these events.

Filmography

References

External links

Living people
British male film actors
British male television actors
1940 births
Place of birth missing (living people)